SASF may refer to:

 SASF Cup, South African Soccer Federation Cup, 1961 to 1985
 South African Special Forces
 Southampton Animal Shelter Foundation
 Southern Africa Social Forum, former conference
 South Australian Soccer Federation, former governing body of football in South Australia
 Spanish Air and Space Force